Keith Birdsong (July 14, 1959 – June 4, 2019) was a Muscogee Creek-Cherokee illustrator, known best for illustrating covers of Star Trek novels, which usually depicted the various characters of the Star Trek television series and movies in a realistic manner.

Life and career 

A self-taught artist, Birdsong grew up in Muskogee, Oklahoma, until the age of 15. He subsequently moved to California, and Texas for one year each. He then moved to Missouri, where he finished school, and got married before joining the United States Army, serving in the 82nd Airborne Division. He completed several illustration projects for the Army during this time.

Birdsong worked as a journalist before becoming a professional illustrator. His chosen medium was acrylic paint and colored pencil. He did illustration work for Star Trek, books of the cyberpunk role-playing game Shadowrun, and children's books such as The Halloween Hex: Hi-Tech Howard.

In addition to book covers, Birdsong's work has appeared in films, on collectors' plates for the Hamilton Collection and the Bradford Exchange, and on U.S. postage stamps, including an issuance honoring American Indian dance and six "Celebrate the Century" stamps that commemorated the 1960s.

Birdsong's family includes Sheila Corley, his sister DeeJay Gaugh, his daughter Candice Jordan, and two granddaughters.

Stroke and death 
In June 2018, Keith had a hemorrhagic stroke and doctors told him he would never walk or talk again, much less paint. However, Birdsong recovered and returned to painting. Birdsong died on June 4, 2019, as a result of injuries sustained in a car crash.

Notable clients 
 United States Post Office
 Paramount Studios
 NASA
 Lucas Film
 Simon & Schuster
 Pocket Books
 New American Library
 Berkley Books
 Bradford Exchange 
 Random House 
 Prentice Hall 
 Harlequin 
 Ace Books
 De Laurentiis Studios 
 Penguin
 Roc

See also
 List of Native American artists
 Visual arts by indigenous peoples of the Americas

Notes

1959 births
2019 deaths
Native American illustrators
Place of death missing
Muscogee people
American people of Cherokee descent
People from Muskogee, Oklahoma
Military personnel from Oklahoma
Artists from Oklahoma
20th-century American artists
21st-century American artists